Zohoor Alaa (Arabic; زهور علاء) (born 18 March 1979) is an Iraqi TV actress.

Early life
Zohoor Alaa Nooriddeen was born in Baghdad in, Iraq in 1982. One of her most important serials is Beet Gazal in 2012 which presented Al Sharqiya, and resulted in her fame in Iraq.

TV serials
 Hob wa Jonon  2004
 Al Mario 2007
 Nojjom Lalia  2008
 Beet Gazal   2012
 Madenatna  2016

References

1979 births
Living people
Iraqi television actresses
Iraqi comedians
20th-century Iraqi actresses
21st-century Iraqi actresses